The Acton Football Club is a defunct Australian Rules Football club that played in the ACT AFL from 1924 to 1973. The club wore black and white colours, similar to the Swan Districts Football Club. Acton merged with Queanbeyan in 1952 but separated in 1958. In 1974, Acton was replaced in the ACTAFL by West Canberra, which not only adopted Acton's black and white colours, but also recruited the vast majority of its players.

Premierships
Acton won two ACT AFL premierships as a stand-alone club in 1924 and 1927, and three as a combined Queanbeyan-Acton team in 1953, 1954 and 1956.

References

AFL Canberra clubs
1924 establishments in Australia
Australian rules football clubs established in 1924
1973 disestablishments in Australia
Australian rules football clubs disestablished in 1973